Unchahar is a constituency of the Uttar Pradesh Legislative Assembly covering the city of Unchahar in the Rae Bareli district of Uttar Pradesh, India.

Unchahar is one of five assembly constituencies in the Lok Sabha constituency of Rae Bareli. It was established as instructed by the Delimitaion Order 2008. It is number 183 among the constituencies of Uttar Pradesh Legislative Assembly.

Currently this seat belongs to Samajwadi Party candidate Manoj Kumar Pandey who won in last Assembly election of 2022 Uttar Pradesh Vidhan Sabha Elections defeating BJP candidate Amarpal Maurya by a margin of 6621 votes. Manoj Kumar Pandey also holds this seat since the first election after its creation, that is, since 2012.

Members of Legislative Assembly

Election results

2022 

 

>

2017

2012

Note: Constituency was established in 2008, hence no Swing data.

See also
Rae Bareli District
Rae Bareli Lok Sabha constituency
18th Uttar Pradesh Legislative Assembly
Uttar Pradesh Vidhan Sabha

References

External links
 

Assembly constituencies of Uttar Pradesh
Politics of Meerut district
Constituencies established in 2008
2008 establishments in Uttar Pradesh